Petz Sports: Dog Playground (Petz Sports in North America) is a sim game released for Wii, Mac OS and Microsoft Windows. It was developed and published by Ubisoft and released November 4, 2008 in North America and November 13, 2008 in Europe.

Gameplay
Petz Sports is a sim game designed for 1 to 4 players and revolves around caring for a puppy. The puppy grows throughout the game.

Key features include:
18 Dog Breeds, including Bernese Mountain Dog, Chihuahua, Golden Retriever, Rottweiler, Poodle, and Pug.
22 Tricks
36 Agility Courses

Dogs can be dressed up with various unlockable hair coat types and items. Up to four friends can play, and by using Wii Remotes in the Wii version, dogs can be exchanged.

External links
IGN Petz Sports
Apple Review (archived link)

2008 video games
MacOS games
Ubisoft games
Wii games
Video games about dogs
Video games developed in Canada
Virtual pet video games
Windows games